Jørgen Engelbrecht (born 24 April 1946) is a retired Danish rower. Together with Niels Henry Secher, he won a world title at the 1970 World Rowing Championships and finished fourth at the 1972 Summer Olympics in the double sculls event.

References

External links
 

1946 births
Living people
Olympic rowers of Denmark
Rowers at the 1972 Summer Olympics
Danish male rowers
World Rowing Championships medalists for Denmark
Rowers from Copenhagen